The Red Arrows is the aerobatics display team of the Royal Air Force.

Red Arrows may also refer to:

 Lowell high school, a public  secondary school in Lowell, Michigan USA, nicknamed "Red Arrows" in honor of the 32nd Red Arrow Infantry Division
 Red Arrows F.C., a Zambian soccer club
 Al-Mussanah Club “Red Arrows“, Omani sports club
 The Red Arrows, a UK express bus service operated between Wearside and Newcastle by Go Northern Ltd. 
 Red Arrows Sky Force, plane ride at Blackpool Pleasure Beach

See also 
 Red Arrow (disambiguation)